The Michigan State–Notre Dame football rivalry is an American college football rivalry between the Michigan State Spartans and Notre Dame Fighting Irish. The first game between the teams took place on November 25, 1897. Notre Dame leads the all-time series 48–28–1.

Since 1949, the teams competed for the Megaphone Trophy, a trophy introduced by the Alumni Clubs of Notre Dame and Michigan State to be presented to the winner of the game. Notre Dame leads the Megaphone Trophy series 33–27–1. 

The Notre Dame side of the trophy is blue, while the Michigan State side is green, and the year of the game and teams' respective scores running down the middle. The current trophy is the third trophy as the prior two trophies no longer have space for the respective games to be included.

The rivalry includes several notable games, such as the 1966 game, arguably one of the greatest college football games ever played. Notre Dame currently leads the series. Games played prior to 1949 also appear on the trophy to commemorate the entire series. Notre Dame is the current holder of the trophy, with a 38–18 victory on September 23, 2017.  They will hold the Megaphone Trophy until 2026 when the two teams are scheduled to play again.

Recent games
After an 8–0 series run by Notre Dame from 1987 to 1994, tying the series win streak set by Michigan State from 1955 to 1963 (they didn't meet in 1958), Michigan State won five games in a row. Michigan State won 44–41 in double overtime at Notre Dame in 2005. Notre Dame pulled out a thrilling come from behind 40–37 victory in East Lansing in 2006. The trend continued in 2007 for Michigan State under new head coach Mark Dantonio who defeated the Fighting Irish 31–14, recording MSU's sixth straight victory at Notre Dame. On September 20, 2008, MSU defeated Notre Dame 23–7 in East Lansing, ending the series "jinx" of home teams always losing since 2001. Notre Dame returned the favor the following year by defeating MSU at Notre Dame. The 2010 meeting had one of the most exciting finishes to the start of the college football season. A back and forth battle the entire game, Notre Dame took the lead in overtime off of a field goal. After Spartans quarterback Kirk Cousins was sacked on third down, Michigan State lined up for a field goal to tie the game at 31. They faked it, and the holder Aaron Bates tossed a game-winning touchdown pass to Charlie Gantt to win it 34–31 for the Spartans. In 2011, the Irish reclaimed the trophy with a 31–13 victory in which they led all the way. Notre Dame's 17–13 victory in South Bend in 2013 made it three wins in a row for the Irish and was perhaps the most controversial game in memory. The teams renewed the rivalry in 2016, as No. 12 Michigan State reclaimed the trophy by defeating No. 18 Notre Dame in South Bend 36–28.

In 2017, Notre Dame traveled to East Lansing to take on the Spartans once again. Notre Dame quarterback Brandon Wimbush threw for a touchdown and ran for another as Notre Dame routed Michigan State 38–18. Notre Dame's defense forced three turnovers in the game, including an interception thrown by MSU QB Brian Lewerke. The interception was returned for a touchdown by Irish defensive back Julian Love on MSU's first possession, giving the Irish an early 14–0 lead.  Both teams then swapped touchdown drives.  Down 21–7, Michigan State drove deep into Notre Dame territory, and appeared to score to make it a one touchdown game as running back LJ Scott rumbled into the endzone late in the first half. However, Scott had the ball jarred free at the half-yard line by Notre Dame defensive back Shawn Crawford.  Crawford also recovered the forced fumble in the end zone, resulting in a touch back. The play resulted in a 14-point swing, as Notre Dame drove the length of the field in just four plays, taking a commanding 28–7 lead into halftime off of the three devastating Michigan State turnovers.

Game results

See also

 List of NCAA college football rivalry games
 1966 Notre Dame vs. Michigan State football game

Notes

References

College football rivalries in the United States
Michigan State Spartans football
Notre Dame Fighting Irish football